Andriy Dolud was a Ukrainian military figure and was Cornet General of the Ukrainian People's Army and Chief of Staff of the Ukrainian People's Army in the First Winter Campaign. He would later serve in the Ukrainian Liberation Army.

Biography
During the First World War he fought in the modern-day Ternopil Oblast as a member of the troops of the South-Western Front.

From 1917 to 1918 he was a member of the Central Council of Ukraine. On November 13, 1918, at the head of the Cossack detachment named after Ivan Honta, formed of Dnieper Ukrainians, he arrived in Lviv to help the Ukrainian Galician Army. He took part in the Polish-Ukrainian War and from the end of 1918 he commanded the Yaniv second brigade of the UGA, which distinguished itself in battles with Polish units on the outskirts of Lviv, during the Vovchukhiv Operation (Ukr) of 1919 and the Chortkiv offensive of 1919.

From December 1919 to May 1920 he was chief of staff of the UPR Army during the First Winter Campaign. During the Polish-Soviet War, he commanded the 5th Kherson Division of the UPA Army. In November 1920 he was interned with a division near Pidvolochysk. In 1921 he left for Brazil.

In 1942 he formally headed the Ukrainian Liberation Army, which was formed as part of the ground forces of the Wehrmacht. From 1943 he headed the Zaporizhzhya detachment of the Ukrainian Free Cossacks in Ost-Nachschub-Bataillon 651 as part of the Wehrmacht, which in 1945 became part of the 2nd Ukrainian Division of the Ukrainian National Army.

In 1944 he was a member of the Cossack staff of General Andriy Shkuro.

Together with Colonel Datskiv, they organized the camp for Ukrainians in Ulm. After 1945 he emigrated to Latin America.

Died September 6, 1976, buried in Curitiba, Paraná, Brazil

References

Bibliography
 K. E. Naumenko . Dolud Andriy // Encyclopedia of Modern Ukraine: in 30 volumes / ed. count IM Dziuba [etc.]; NAS of Ukraine, NTSh . - K, Institute of Encyclopedic Research of the National Academy of Sciences of Ukraine, 2001–2020. - 10,000 copies. - .
  Savchenko GP  Dolud Andriy, Encyclopedia of the History of Ukraine, VA Smoliy and others, Institute of History of Ukraine, National Academy of Sciences of Ukraine . - K . : Scientific thought, 2004 . - Т. 2: Г - Д. - 518 с. : il. -  Page 440.
 Yaroslav Yuriyovych Tynchenko, Officer Corps of the Army of the Ukrainian People's Republic (1917-1921). Book I Tempora, 2007. - .
 Yaroslav Yuriyovych Tynchenko, Officer Corps of the Army of the Ukrainian People's Republic (1917-1921). Book II Tempora, 2007. - .
Central State Archive of the highest authorities and administration of Ukraine - List of sergeants enlisted in the actual Ukrainian military service and promoted to the following ranks during July 1920 - July 1923 
Gutsal P . Dolud Andriy // Ternopil encyclopedic dictionary  : in 4 volumes / editor: G. Yavorsky and others. - Ternopil: Publishing and Printing Plant "Zbruch" , 2004. - Vol. 1: A - J. - P. 519. - .
 G.P. Sawczenko, Dolud Andriy, Encyclopedia of the History of Ukraine, vol. 2, 2005.
 Encyclopedia of Ukrainian Studies, Lviv 1998, volume 2, p. 559

1893 births
1976 deaths
West Ukrainian People's Republic people
Ukrainian people of World War I
Russian military personnel of World War I
Ukrainian Galician Army people
Ukrainian people of the Polish–Ukrainian War
Ukrainian people of the Ukrainian–Soviet War
People of the Polish–Soviet War
Ukrainian people of World War II
Ukrainian SSR emigrants to Brazil